As its name suggests, it is the first oil well in the Arabian side of the Persian Gulf and is located in Bahrain. The well is situated below Jebel Dukhan. It was discovered and operated by Bahrain Petroleum Company (BAPCO), established in 1929 in Canada by Standard Oil Company of California. 

Oil first spurted from this well on 16 October 1931, and the well finally began to blow heads of oil on the morning of 2 June 1932. In 1980, BAPCO was taken over by the Government of Bahrain. Close to the well, which has been reconstructed to its first appearance, is a stable.

Bahrain was the first place on the Arabian side of the Persian Gulf where oil was discovered, and it coincided with the collapse of the world pearl market.

References

Economic history of Bahrain
Landmarks in Bahrain
1931 in Bahrain
Oil fields of Bahrain
Buildings and structures completed in 1931
History of the petroleum industry